The Mendota Bridge (full name Fort Snelling–Mendota Bridge), in the US state of Minnesota carries State Highway 55 (MN 55) and MN 62 over the Minnesota River between Fort Snelling and Mendota Heights. It is the final bridge over the Minnesota River before the Minnesota flows into the Mississippi River at the "Meeting of the waters" or "Mendota" in the Dakota language. Traffic on the north end of the bridge may turn onto the Fort Road Bridge (MN 5) to cross the Mississippi River into Saint Paul, Minnesota. The skylines of both Minneapolis and Saint Paul can be seen simultaneously from the bridge.

History
The structure was designed by C.A.P. Turner and Walter H. Wheeler. Turner also designed the Aerial Lift Bridge in Duluth, Minnesota, and the Liberty Memorial Bridge between Bismarck and Mandan, North Dakota.

The bridge is dedicated to the "Gopher Gunners", 151st Field Artillery who died in World War I.

It was added to the National Register of Historic Places in 1979.

Between 1940 and 1965, the bridge also carried the concurrent designation of MN 100.

From 1992 to 1994, the old bridge was demolished down to the arches and rebuilt from the arches up with the new wider deck  higher than the original.

See also
 List of crossings of the Minnesota River

References

External links

 Mendota Bridge in Highways, Byways, And Bridge Photography
 National Bridge Inventory 

Bridges completed in 1926
Bridges in Hennepin County, Minnesota
Bridges over the Minnesota River
Buildings and structures in Dakota County, Minnesota
Concrete bridges in Minnesota
Great River Road
Mendota, Minnesota
National Register of Historic Places in Dakota County, Minnesota
National Register of Historic Places in Hennepin County, Minnesota
Open-spandrel deck arch bridges in the United States
Road bridges on the National Register of Historic Places in Minnesota
Transportation in Dakota County, Minnesota